Zinc finger protein 331 is a protein that in humans is encoded by the ZNF331 gene.

Zinc finger proteins have been shown to interact with nucleic acids and to have diverse functions. The zinc finger domain is a conserved amino acid sequence motif containing 2 specifically positioned cysteines and 2 histidines that are involved in coordinating zinc. Kruppel-related proteins form one family of zinc finger proteins. See ZFP93 (MIM 604749) for additional information on zinc finger proteins.[supplied by OMIM]

References

Further reading